The 1921 St. Xavier Musketeers football team was an American football team that represented St. Xavier College (later renamed Xavier University) as in the Ohio Athletic Conference (OAC) during the 1921 college football season. In its second season under head coach Joseph A. Meyer, the team compiled a 6–2 record and outscored opponents by a total of 171 to 49.

Schedule

References

St. Xavier
Xavier Musketeers football seasons
St. Xavier Saints football